The Department of Veterans' Affairs is a department of the Government of Australia, established in 1976, and charged with the responsibility of delivering government programs for war veterans, members of the Australian Defence Force, members of the Australian Federal Police, and their dependants. 

The current Secretary of the Department of Veterans' Affairs is  Elizabeth Cosson, who succeeded Simon Lewis as secretary on 19 May 2018.

For administration purposes, the department forms part of the Defence portfolio. The Minister for Defence acts on behalf of the Minister for Veterans' Affairs within the Cabinet.

Operational activities
The functions of the department are broadly classified into the following matters:
 Repatriation income support, compensation and health program for veterans, members of the Defence Force, certain mariners and their dependants
Commemorations, including promotion of understanding of Anzac Day, Remembrance Day and Vietnam Veterans' Day
 War graves
Defence Service Homes

Agencies
In carrying out its functions, the department administers the following agencies:
 Australian War Memorial
Military Rehabilitation and Compensation Commission
 Office of Australian War Graves
Repatriation Commission
Repatriation Medical Authority
Specialist Medical Review Council
Veterans’ Children Education Boards
 Veterans' Review Board

Key legislation
The Department of Veterans' Affairs is responsible for administration of several key Acts:

Key officeholders

Department secretary
The Secretary of the Department of Veterans' Affairs is Liz Cosson, since May 2018. In addition to her role of departmental secretary, she is also the President of the Repatriation Commission and Chair of the Military Rehabilitation and Compensation Commission.

Below is a full list of the Department's Secretaries since it was established.

Other key officeholders
Other key officeholders in the department are the Deputy President of the Repatriation Commission, currently Major General Craig Orme; and the Repatriation Commissioner, currently Major General Mark Kelly AO DSC.

See also
 Minister for Veterans' Affairs
 List of Australian Commonwealth Government entities

References

External links
 Department of Veterans' Affairs web site
 Australia Federal Government Administrative Arrangements

1976 establishments in Australia
Veterans' Affairs
Ministries established in 1976
Veterans' affairs in Australia
Australia